DVS Records is a Dutch independent record label, specializing in progressive metal and related music. It was founded in 2000 by Rene Janssen, a Dutch enthusiast of progressive rock and metal, and also one of the organizers of the ProgPower festival.

Artists

Current artists 
 Voyager

Past artists 

 Into Eternity
 Wolverine

External links 
 Official site

Dutch independent record labels
Record labels established in 2000
Progressive rock record labels